Warley West was a parliamentary constituency in the borough of Sandwell in the West Midlands of England. It was initially centred on the towns of Rowley Regis and Cradley Heath, and from 1983 also incorporated parts of Oldbury.

It  returned one Member of Parliament (MP)  to the House of Commons of the Parliament of the United Kingdom. It was created for the 1974 general election, and abolished for the 1997 general election.

The bulk of Warley West, namely the area around Oldbury, became part of the new Warley constituency, while the area around Rowley Regis and Cradley Heath was absorbed into the new Halesowen and Rowley Regis constituency, which is split between two local authorities (Dudley and Sandwell). Meanwhile, the Tividale section of the constituency (previously split between Dudley and Rowley Regis and Tipton), was incorporated into West Bromwich West.

Boundaries 
1974–1983: The County Borough of Warley wards of Cradley Heath, Langley, Old Hill and Blackheath, Rounds Green, Rowley, St Paul's, and Tividale.

1983–1997: The Metropolitan Borough of Sandwell wards of Blackheath, Cradley Heath and Old Hill, Langley, Oldbury, Rowley, and Tividale.

Members of Parliament

Elections

Elections in the 1970s

Elections in the 1980s

Elections in the 1990s

Notes and references 

Politics of Sandwell
Parliamentary constituencies in the West Midlands (county) (historic)
Constituencies of the Parliament of the United Kingdom established in 1974
Constituencies of the Parliament of the United Kingdom disestablished in 1997